The Last Dodo is a 2007 novel by Jacqueline Rayner.

The Last Dodo may also refer to:

The Last Dodo, a 1967 novel by "Richard Boyde" (pseud. Richard Chopping)
The Last Dodo character in the Warner Brothers cartoon Porky in Wackyland